RenderWare is a video game engine developed by British game developer Criterion Software.

Overview
Released in 1993, RenderWare is a 3D API and graphics rendering engine used in video games, Active Worlds, and some VRML browsers. RenderWare was developed by Criterion Software Limited, then a subsidiary of Canon. It originated in the era of software rendering on CPUs prior to the appearance of GPUs, competing with other libraries such as Argonaut Games's BRender and RenderMorphics' Reality Lab (the latter was acquired by Microsoft and became Direct3D). Renderware 4 was revealed at GDC 2004.

RenderWare's principal commercial importance was in providing an off-the-shelf solution to the difficulties of PS2 graphics programming. As such, the engine was often described as "Sony's DirectX" during this era which was a reference to its surrounding framework and toolchain middleware. Prior to version 2, an external programming or scripting language was required to take advantage of RenderWare. RenderWare 2, on the other hand, has its own internal scripting language: RWX (RenderWare script). However, in RenderWare 3 RWX support was removed. This next iteration focused on a binary model file format. As with the previous version increment, Criterion removed support for RenderWare 3's formats in RenderWare 4.

RenderWare is cross-platform: it runs on Windows as well as Apple Mac OS X-based applications and many video game consoles such as GameCube, Wii, Xbox, Xbox 360, PlayStation 2, PlayStation 3, and PlayStation Portable. RenderWare is no longer available for purchase, although Electronic Arts still honors old contracts, meaning that external developers who licensed the technology before the Criterion acquisition may still use the software. What was RenderWare 4 has dissolved into the rest of EA internal tech. During a 2007 Gamasutra interview, Bing Gordon, EA CCO, has stated that RenderWare did not perform well enough for next-gen hardware, graphics wise, and that RenderWare did not stand up to competition, such as Unreal Engine from Epic Games. He has also stated that the RenderWare team is "mostly a dev house".

See also

References

Further reading 
 
 
 RenderWare3 Docs
 RenderWare V2.1 API Reference
 Historical and technical insight of RenderWare at SIGMA'Co

External links

3D scenegraph APIs
Video game engines
Virtual reality